Wercker is a Docker-based continuous delivery platform that helps software developers build and deploy their applications and microservices. Using its command-line interface, developers can create Docker containers on their desktop, automate their build and deploy processes, testing them on their desktop, and then deploy them to various cloud platforms, ranging from Heroku to AWS and Rackspace. The command-line interface to Wercker has been open-sourced.

The business behind Wercker, also called Wercker, was founded in 2012, and acquired by Oracle Corporation in 2017.

Product 

Wercker targets companies where developers focus on web applications. It acts as the middleman between source-code hosting repositories like GitHub and cloud servers like Amazon Web Services. Each time a developer makes a change to his or her codebase in Git, Wercker retrieves the code, builds a version of it inside a container to isolate it, tests it for errors and then notifies the user if it either passed or failed.

Wercker is integrated with Docker containers, which package up application code and can be easily moved from server to server. Each build artifact can be a Docker container. The user can take the container from the Docker Hub or his private registry and build the code before shipping it. Its SaaS platform enables developers to test and deploy code often. They can push software updates incrementally as they are ready, rather than in bundled dumps. It makes it easier for coders to practice continuous integration, a software engineering practice in which each change a developer makes to the codebase is constantly tested in the process so that software doesn’t break when it goes live.

Wercker is based on the concept of pipelines, which are automated workflows. Pipelines take pieces of code and automatically execute a series of steps upon that code. The Wercker API provides programmatic access to information about applications, builds and deploys. There are code snippets available for Golang, Node.js and Python. The service includes a social networking element, providing a Facebook-like wall so team members know what their colleagues are doing. This creates a high degree of transparency, which is needed by the ever more numerous groups that work across different countries on the same projects.

Wercker is currently available as cloud services, though Wercker is working on an enterprise offering that will allow on-premises use as well.

History 

Hernandez van Leuffen came up with Wercker’s underlying technology for his thesis project on containers and automatic resource provisioning at the University of San Francisco. NexusLabs, a foundation based in Amsterdam and at MIT, helped Wercker attract venture capital from the United States. In January 2013, Wercker received a seed investment from an A-list group of investors. The round was led by Shamrock Ventures with additional support from Greylock Venture Partners, and Amsterdam-based micro VC Vitulum Ventures. Company executives did not reveal the amount of funding they received, but Wercker allegedly raised close to $1 million.

Wercker was part of the 2012 startup incubator program Rockstart Accelerator in Amsterdam. It participated in the Mozilla WebFWD program and won the Salesforce Innovation Challenge. It also won the Gigaom Structure: Europe Launchpad competition, receiving both the People’s Choice and Judge’s awards.

The startup brought on former co-founder of OpenStack Andy Smith as CTO in September 2014. A month later, Wercker brought in $2.4 million, bringing total funding to $3.2 million. Notion Capital drove the investment round along with Tola Capital, Vitulum Ventures, Shamrock Ventures, and Rockstart Accelerator. While Wercker originally focused on LXC containers, it converted its platform to run on the ever more popular Docker containers in late 2014. It launched a local development model, enabling developers to build and deploy containerized applications.

Entrepreneur included Wercker among "9 essential tools for agile product development teams" in July 2015. In December, Atlassian launched a Wercker integration of its Git-based Bitbucket service, called the Wercker YAML Viewer.

In January 2016, Wercker announced a $4.5 million Series A investment round, led by Inkef Capital with participation from Notion Capital, bringing the company’s total funding to $7.5 million. It was the first time that Inkef Capital, one of the largest VC funds in the Netherlands, invested in a developer tool. Wercker announced it would use the investment to drive developer adoption, expand into the enterprise market, and deepen automation capabilities with more flexible and complex development pipelines.

On April 17, 2017, Oracle announced that it had signed a definitive agreement to acquire Wercker.

References

External links 

Wercker on GitHub
Software companies of the Netherlands
Continuous integration
Software companies established in 2012
Software companies disestablished in 2017
Companies based in Amsterdam
Cloud computing providers
Oracle acquisitions
2017 mergers and acquisitions